Yo soy Betty, la fea (English: I am Betty, the Ugly one), often referred to simply as Betty, la fea, is a Colombian telenovela written by Fernando Gaitán which was broadcast from 25 October 1999 to 8 May 2001 by RCN. More than a dozen versions of the telenovela have been made in other countries due to the popularity of the plot. American comedy-drama hit Ugly Betty, Mexican telenovela La fea más bella, South African comedy uBettina Wethu, and Indian series Jassi Jaissi Koi Nahin are all based on this Colombian telenovela.

Betty, la Fea re-aired on Spanish-language U.S. network TeleFutura in January 2009. Eight years after the telenovela's original run, the highly anticipated return of the original version of Yo Soy Betty, La Fea delivered impressive ratings for the network, attracting over one million viewers, more than half a million of which were adults aged 18–49. In addition, the premiere episode doubled and in some cases nearly tripled its prior audience among all key demographics.

Betty, la fea is one of the world's most acclaimed and popular television shows and is considered the most famous Latin American telenovela in history.  It is the first telenovela to have been remade worldwide and has been regarded as bringing the telenovela to new levels of success.

Plot
Taking place mainly in Bogotá, Colombia, Betty La Fea is essentially a Cinderella comedy about the rise of poor, ugly 'Betty' Pinzón and the fall of rich, handsome Armando Mendoza. Armando is a very incompetent playboy with a scheme to turn a huge profit as the new president of Eco Moda, a famous clothing manufacturing company. But his scheme is doomed for his faulty mathematics. Because Betty, his secretary (and economics wizard), is in love with him, she helps Armando deceive the board of directors as he loses money and brings the company to ruin. The story has three movements: 1) Armando's foolish destruction of Eco Moda, 2) Betty's flight from the disgrace and her vacation in Cartagena where she undergoes an emotional and physical transformation, and 3) Betty's return to Eco Moda, where she is installed as new president.

Production 
One year after being released as a private channel, RCN had disastrous results against Caracol TV, so Carlos Ardila Lulle took direct control of the channel. The usual director and writer Fernando Gaitán was used, who prepared the telenovela, which would be low-budget; since it was shot in the industrial zone of Bogotá near the RCN studios where some scenes were also shot. The Pinzón Solano residence was filmed in a house in the Teusaquillo neighborhood of Bogotá.

Natalia Ramírez originally cast for the lead role, but she lost to Ana María Orozco, but because of Ramírez's career she was given the role of Marcela Valencia.

Awards
In 2001, Yo soy Betty, la fea won the New York Latin ACE Award for the Best Scenic Program (Mejor programa escénico) and International Female Personality of the Year (Figura internacional femenina del año) to Ana María Orozco, and, also in 2002, the TP de Oro for Best Soap Opera (Mejor telenovela), and the INTE Award for Best Soap Opera and Actress of the Year (Actriz del año) to Ana María Orozco.

Series evolution
Betty la fea was created, filmed, and produced in Colombia and originally aired on RCN and was released to air on Telemundo in 2000, and on TeleFutura nine years later, in the United States. Several similar programs were created in other countries, as well as its rebroadcast in other languages around the world. The success of Yo soy Betty, la fea led to its first sequel in 2002 with Univision's release of "Ecomoda". Some scenes from the first episode were filmed in Buenos Aires,  and some scenes for the opening sequence were filmed in Miami, Florida.

The phenomenal success of Betty la fea accounts for numerous adaptations and airings around the world. The story appeals to global audiences because it is centered around the life of an unattractive character rather than that of a typical attractive character.

Spinoffs include an animated series called Betty Toons, featuring Betty as a child with her friends. In the U.S., Betty Toons previously aired Saturday mornings on most affiliates of Telefutura (now UniMás), as part of the Toonturama block from 2006 to 2008.

Ugly Betty, the U.S. adaptation of Betty La Fea, aired on ABC from 2006 to 2010. The hour-long program was developed by Silvio Horta and co-produced by Salma Hayek and Ben Silverman. America Ferrera played the title role. The show has received a Golden Globe and Peabody Award.

Cast

Main cast

Ana María Orozco as Beatriz "Betty" Aurora Pinzón Solano; A rather uncouth woman but very skilled in economics with a good CV. Later becomes a CEO assistant and economist. She is the pride of her parents. She is in love with Armando Mendoza.
Jorge Enrique Abello as Armando Mendoza Sáenz; Eco Moda's CEO. A somewhat irresponsible playboy with only basic knowledge in industrial engineering who presents a risky and ambitious proposal with which he wins the presidency of Eco Moda. When he manages it it brings the company to the brink of bankruptcy, thus Betty steps in to help.
Natalia Ramírez as Marcela Valencia; Armando's fiancée and Eco Moda's stockholder and retail manager. Despite her dislike of Betty she is not actually a bad person but a woman full of dignity who loves Armando. She later willingly gives up on him as she discovers he actually loves Betty.
Lorna Paz as Patricia Fernández, antagonist; Marcela's best friend and secretary. A divorced woman, refined and superficial, as well as materialist, she is looking for a rich husband. Armando hates her because she is a dumb blonde and knows that Marcela wants her as Armando's secretary to watch over his infidelities.
Luis Mesa as Daniel Valencia; antagonist, Marcela's brother. Male chauvinist and arrogant, shareholder of Eco Moda. He rivals and dislikes Armando and unlike him, he is realistic and the only one worried about his company. He has an affair with Patricia.
Julián Arango as Hugo Lombardi; Eco Moda's fashion designer. Openly gay and arrogant, who despises ugliness. He dislikes almost everyone at Eco Moda and especially hates Eco Moda's secretaries, whom he nicknames 'The Ugly Cartel', with the exception of Inesita who is perhaps the only person he actually cares for. Interesting, Arango was in real life married to Ana María Orozco.
Ricardo Vélez as Mario Calderón; Armando's best friend and Eco Moda's commercial vice president. A staunch playboy, inveterate enemy of commitments and fatherhood, he is strangely enough a rather neutral figure.
Mario Duarte as Nicolás Mora Cifuentes; Betty's best friend and economist. Like Betty, he is unattractive and highly intelligent. He is in love with Patricia and boasts of his position as president of Terramoda. Patricia softens to him but only because of his newfound wealth.
Kepa Amuchastegui as Roberto Mendoza; Armando's father, founder of the company. Kind hearted and intelligent. 
Talú Quintero as Margarita Sáenz de Mendoza; Armando's mother.
Adriana Franco as Julia Solano Galindo de Pinzón; Betty's mother. Loves her daughter dearly.
Jorge Herrera as Hermes Pinzón Galarza; Betty's father and accountant.
Pilar Uribe as María Beatriz Valencia; Marcela's and Daniel's sister. Carefree woman who loves opulence.
Julio César Herrera as Freddy Stewart Contreras; messenger, infatuated with Aura Maria and also in love of Jenny. Flamboyant but not gay, he is a very happy man.
Dora Cadavid (†) as Inés "Inesita" Ramírez de Muriel; seamstress, member of the cartel. Kind and wise, she is the elderly assistant to Hugo Lombardi who loves her like a mother. She is the voice of reason and is as sane as Betty in the cartel.
Estefanía Gómez as Aura María Fuentes Rico; receptionist, member of the cartel. Single mother looking for a husband and stepfather for her son. Beautiful and voluptuous, she is usually promiscuous but with a big heart.
Paula Peña as Sofía López de Rodríguez; secretary, member of the cartel. Divorced woman who constantly fights with her ex-husband Efraín over their children's pension. She has a feud with Jenny, the current romantic partner of her ex-husband. Formerly Gustavo Olarte's secretary and after his dismissal, she temporarily becomes Betty's secretary.
Luces Velásquez as Bertha Muñoz de González; Gutiérrez' secretary, somewhat gluttonous, member of the cartel. She is married with children and deeply loves her husband. She occasionally imitates Patricia's way of dressing.
Marcela Posada as Sandra Patiño; Calderón's secretary, member of the cartel. Known for her height. She is usually aggressive with whoever is the enemy of the cartel.
María Eugenía Arboleda as Mariana Valdés; Marcela's secretary, member of the cartel. Known for reading tarot, she is very optimistic and a lover of rumba. 
Celmira Luzardo (†) as Catalina Ángel; Betty's "fairy godmother" and public relationist. A dignified, loquacious, eloquent and recognized woman.
Alberto León Jaramillo as Saúl Gutiérrez; Eco Moda's Director of Human Resources. Pedantic and smug man who also despises ugliness and is known for his "Spanglish". He usually sides with whoever is in charge.
Marta Isabel Bolaños as Jenny García; Efraín's younger girlfriend. Attractive but quite dimwitted and materialistic, she rivals Sofía for Efraín's money. She calls Efraín "pupuchurro".
David Ramírez as Wilson Sastoque Mejía; Eco Moda's security guard and friend to Betty and her friends.
Raúl Santa (†) as Efraín Rodríguez Merchán "El Cheque"; Sofia's ex-husband and Jenny's boyfriend.
Patrick Delmas as Michel Doinel; Betty's handsome friend and suitor. He is in love with Betty, to whom he offers a stable relationship without caring that she is virtually ugly.
Diego Cadavid as Román; street rat, antagonist.

Occasional guests
Alberto Valdiri (†) as "Gordito" González, Bertha's husband.
 Angeline Moncayo as Karina Larson. Formerly a model and Armando's ex-mistress.
 Carlos Serrato as Gustavo Olarte, Eco Moda's ex-financial vice president. Daniel's right hand.
 César Mora as Antonio Sánchez, Betty's lawyer.
 Claudia Becerra as Mónica Agudelo.
 Diego Vivanco as Rolando "el Chesito su mercé", Hugo's boyfriend. Is bisexual.
 Germán Tóvar as José Ambrosio Rosales; lawyer, Antonio's colleague.
 Hugo Perez as Rafael Muriel, Inesita's ex husband.
 Iván Piñeros as Jimmy Fuentes (Aura María's son).
 Lorena McAllister as Diana Medina.
 Luis Enrique Roldán as Juan Manuel Santamaría, penalist Eco Moda's lawyer.
Miguel Ángel Báes as a 2nd systems engineer.
 Paulo Sánchez Neira as Miguel Ortíz, Eco Moda's ex-systems engineer at the service of Olarte.
 Rubén Óliver as Miguel Robles, corrupt president of Rag Tela.
 Sebastián Sánchez as Miguel. (2001)
 Scarlet Ortiz as Alejandra Zingg.
 Yesenia Valencia as Susi.
 Verónica Ocampo as Claudia Bosch, an attractive model obsessed with Armando since both had an affair.
 Vilma Vera as Maruja Bravo de Gutiérrez, Saul Gutiérrez's wife.

Special guests
Adriana Arboleda as herself.
Anasol as herself.
Andrea Serna as herself.
Andrés Pastrana Arango as himself.
Armando Manzanero as himself.
Bettina Spitz as herself.
Catalina Acosta as herself.
Catalina Maya as herself.
Cecilia Bolocco as herself.
Charlie Zaa as himself.
Claudia Elena Vásquez as herself.
Fanny Kertzmann (head of DIAN) as herself.
Franco De Vita as himself.
Gino Molinari as himself.
Gisela Valcárcel as herself.
Gloria Calzada as herself.
Karoll Márquez as himself.
Kike Santander as himself.
Laura Flores as herself.
Lina Marulanda (†) as herself.
Olga Tañón as herself.
Patricia Velásquez as herself.
Paula Andrea Betancourt as herself.
Ricardo Montaner as himself.
Santiago Cruz as himself.
Silvia Tcherassi as herself.
Taís Araújo as herself.
Valeria Mazza as herself.

Original Colombian version in other countries
The original Colombian version of the show has been dubbed or subbed then broadcast in Greece (« Μαρία η Άσχημη ») India(Jassi Jaissi Koi Nahin), Lithuania, Indonesia, Poland (Brzydula), Bulgaria, Romania (Betty cea urâtă), Malaysia, Hungary (Betty, a csúnya lány), Czech Republic (Ošklivka Betty), Italy (Betty la cozza), Switzerland, Georgia (უშნო ბეტი), Japan – under the title Betty, Ai to uragiri no hishojitsu ("Betty, The Secretarial Office of Love and Betrayal ", ベティ愛と裏切りの秘書室)–, Turkey, Philippines, and China. The show was also broadcast in virtually all of Latin America plus Spain, achieving record ratings in every single country, including those where Colombian soaps do not usually achieve high ratings, such as Brazil and Mexico. Later, the cast went on tour to meet fans throughout the continent.

See also
 List of Colombian TV Shows
 Cinema of Colombia
 Culture of Colombia
 List of television show franchises

Sources
 Awards for Yo soy Betty, la fea
 TP de Oro, Spain
 Eco moda
 Google translation of Spanish Imitating Fashion, the Second Part of Betty the Ugly One, Began To film in Buenos Aires

References

External links
 

 
Colombian telenovelas
Colombian comedy television series
Comedy telenovelas
1999 telenovelas
2000 telenovelas
2001 telenovelas
1999 Colombian television series debuts
2001 Colombian television series endings
RCN Televisión telenovelas
Spanish-language telenovelas
Television shows set in Bogotá
Fashion-themed television series